Frederick Hollands (7 October 1822 – 30 June 1898) was an English professional cricketer who played for Kent County Cricket Club between 1849 and 1859. He played in a total of 31 first-class cricket matches.

Hollands was born at Leeds, Kent in 1822, the son of Edwin and Mary Hollands. His father was an agricultural labourer. Hollands, who was a left-arm spin bowler, played club cricket for a wide variety of sides, including Town Malling, Gravesend and The Mote. After bowling impressively for West Kent in 1848, taking 12 wickets and dismissing both Fuller Pilch and Alfred Mynn, he made his first-class debut the following season, playing for Kent against an All-England XI at Gravesend.

He took five-wickets in an innings 11 times and bowled unchanged throughout a match with Ned Willsher at Lord's against MCC in 1856. He took six wickets for 56 runs (6/56) for an England side against Nottinghamshire in 1855 and his best innings figures of 6/15 for Kent against MCC at Gravesend in 1857. He was a prolific bowler in non-first-class matches, regularly playing for Kentish club sides against touring professional elevens.

Hollands did not play first-class cricket after 1859, but retained an interest in the county side―Lord Harris recalled that he would wait for news of Kent's results at the side of the road. He worked as a gamekeeper at Leeds Park from the 1870s, although Scores and Biographies describes him as a "wood dealer". He married Alice Quartermaine at Sandwich in 1851; the couple had three children. Hollands died at Broomfield in 1898 aged 75.

References

External links

1822 births
1898 deaths
English cricketers
Kent cricketers
People from Leeds, Kent